The 1988–89 Vanderbilt Commodores men's basketball men's basketball team represented Vanderbilt University as a member of the Southeastern Conference during the 1988–89 college basketball season. The team was led by head coach C. M. Newton and played its home games at Memorial Gymnasium.

The Commodores finished with a 19–14 record (12–6 SEC, 3rd) and received an at-large bid to the NCAA tournament.

Roster

Schedule and results

|-
!colspan=9 style=| Regular season

|-
!colspan=9 style=| SEC tournament

|-
!colspan=9 style=| NCAA tournament

NBA draft

References

Vanderbilt Commodores men's basketball seasons
Vanderbilt
Vanderbilt Commodores men's basketball
Vanderbilt Commodores men's basketball
Vanderbilt